Zeeshan Siddiqui (born 24 February 1975) is a Pakistani-born Norwegian cricketer. He played in the 2015 ICC World Cricket League Division Six tournament.

References

External links
 

1975 births
Living people
Norwegian cricketers
Pakistani emigrants to Norway
Cricketers from Karachi